Bonsai Superstar is the second album from the band Brainiac released on November 21, 1994. It is the first album on which guitarist John Schmersal appears, who remained as the band's lead guitarist until their break-up in 1997.

Originally released through Grass Records on LP and CD formats, the album is now out-of-print. Currently, the album's copyright is owned by The Bicycle Music Company after Grass Records merged with Wind-Up Records and subsequently sold the copyrights to the band's music.

Background and recording
The album was recorded in Brooklyn, New York with engineering and production duties done by Girls Against Boys bassist Eli Janney. The album was edited at Ward Joe, New York City and was mixed in Brooklyn. Larry Nicki mastered the album in Ardent, Memphis, Tennessee. The track "Meathook Manicure" was specifically recorded in the basement of one of the band member's house. To record the vocals, a cheap bullet microphone was used, which experienced a short out during the recording, resulting in some added feedback noise in the final recording.

The track "You Wrecked My Hair" was the first song by the group to feature contributions by Schmersal. The voice samples on "Fucking With the Altimiter" was taken from a record Taylor found at a store Knoxville, Tennessee. The vocals for the chorus on "Fucking With the Altimiter" were performed in front of a fan, giving them a type of stutter effect.

Reception
While the album received little critical attention since its initial release in 1994, the attention it did end up receiving was very positive. Today Bonsai Superstar is considered as one of the best recordings by the band. In Brain Egan's review for the All Music Guide, he rewarded the album four out of five stars, stating that the album "captures a band that was ahead of their time and still moving forward". Tim Krug, of Oh Condor, referred to the recording as his favorite album of all time. Pitchfork Media ranked this album #57 in their Top 100 albums of the 1990s feature.

Track listing

Personnel

Brainiac
Tim Taylor (credited as timmytaylor) - vocals
John Schmersal (credited as Little Greenie) - guitar
Juan Monasterio (credited as Monostereo and B Chango) - bass
Tyler Trent (credited as Claire Quilty) - drums

Production
Eli Janney - production, engineering, navigation
Larry Nicki - mastering
The Puddles - photography

References

1994 albums
Brainiac (band) albums